Michael Paul Thompson (born November 6, 1980) is a former Major League Baseball pitcher.

The 6'4 right-hander was selected by the San Diego Padres in the 5th round of the 1999 Major League Baseball Draft. In , Thompson showed his first signs of serious major league potential with the Double-A Mobile BayBears. That season, he went 10–2 with a 3.41 ERA.

Thompson started the  season with the Triple-A Portland Beavers. He was called up to the Padres on May 17, defeating the Arizona Diamondbacks in his major league debut. Thompson went on to start 15 more games for the big league club in 2006. In , he played in the Pittsburgh Pirates organization and became a free agent at the end of the season.

External links

1980 births
Living people
People from Baca County, Colorado
Baseball players from Colorado
Major League Baseball pitchers
San Diego Padres players
Arizona League Padres players
Fort Wayne Wizards players
Idaho Falls Padres players
Lake Elsinore Storm players
Mobile BayBears players
Portland Beavers players
Indianapolis Indians players
Gulf Coast Pirates players
Somerset Patriots players